Mella is a rural locality in the local government area (LGA) of Circular Head in the North-west and west LGA region of Tasmania. The 2016 census recorded a population of 74 for the state suburb of Mella.

History 
Mella was gazetted as a locality in 1971. Mella is believed to be an Aboriginal word meaning “to run”. 

The Lacrum Dairy Farm, which features a rotary milking parlor and is open to the public, is in the locality.

Geography
Scopus Creek forms part of the southern boundary, flows through to the north, and then forms a small part of the northern boundary.

Road infrastructure 
Route A2 (Bass Highway) runs past to the south-east. From there Mella Road provides access to the locality.

References

Towns in Tasmania
Localities of Circular Head Council